First League may refer to:

Association football

Current Leagues

 Armenian First League, the Armenian second tier men's division
 Austrian Football First League, the Austrian second tier men's division
 Belarusian First League, the Belarusian second tier men's division
 First League of Belgrade, a section of Serbia's fifth football league
 First League of the Federation of Bosnia and Herzegovina, a second-level league
 First League of Primorje-Gorski Kotar County, the fifth level league in the Croatian football league system
 First League of the Republika Srpska, a second-level football competition in Bosnia and Herzegovina
 First League of Zagreb, a county-level league in Croatia
 Bulgarian First League, the Bulgarian top-flight men's division
 Czech First League, the Czech top-flight men's division
 First Macedonian Football League, the Macedonian top-flight men's division
 Montenegrin First League, the Montenegrin top-flight men's division
 TFF First League, the Turkish second tier men's division
 Serbian First League, the Serbian second tier men's division
 Ukrainian First League, the Ukrainian second tier men's division
 Uzbekistan First League, the Uzbekistan second tier men's division

Defunct leagues

 Czechoslovak First League, the former Czechoslovak top-flight men's division (1925–1993)
 Soviet First League, the former Soviet second-flight men's football division (1936–1991)
 First League of Herzeg-Bosnia, the top football league in Croatian Republic of Herzeg-Bosnia (1993–2001)
 First League of Serbia and Montenegro, the former Yugoslav/Serbo-Montenegrin top-flight men's division (1992–2006)
 Yugoslav First League, the former Yugoslav top-flight men's division (1923–1992)

Other
 First League of Armed Neutrality, an alliance of European naval powers, 1780–1783

Association football leagues